The Sir George-Étienne Cartier National Historic Site is a historic house museum in Old Montreal commemorating the life and accomplishments of Sir George-Étienne Cartier. This reconstitution of the adjoining homes of the Cartier family features the architectural heritage left by the upper middle class of 19th-century Montreal, along with interpretive activities and theatrical performances.

It was designated a National Historic Site of Canada in 1964.

References

External links

Old Montreal
George-Étienne Cartier
Historic house museums in Quebec
Museums in Montreal
National Historic Sites in Quebec
Houses in Montreal
Cartier